Limburg Lions is a handball team from Sittard-Geleen, Limburg. The club was founded in 2008 by a merger of the men's teams of HV Sittardia from Sittard, V&L from Geleen and HV BFC from Beek. The Lions took the place of HV Sittardia in the NHV Eredivisie after the merger. The first team plays its home games at Stadssporthal (Sittard).

Limburg Lions also has a second team, which plays in the Dutch premier division, and an A-youth team, which plays in the national A-youth division.

The first team won the national championship and the Cup of the Netherlands three years in a row between 2015 and 2017. It has also won twice the Dutch Supercup and once the BENE League.

In 2016, the management of BFC decided to take no longer part in the collabation.

Accomplishments

Eredivisie: 
Winners (3) : 2015, 2016, 2017
Runner-Up (5) : 2011, 2012, 2013, 2014, 2018
BENE-League: 
Winners (2) : 2015, 2022
Runner-Up (4) : 2016, 2017, 2018, 2020
Dutch Handball Cup: 
Winners (3) : 2015, 2016, 2017
Runner-Up (3) : 2013, 2014, 2019
Dutch Supercup: 
Winners (3) : 2016
Runner-Up (3) : 2015, 2017

Former players 
 Lambert Schuurs (2008–2009)
 Iso Sluijters (2012–2013)
Luc Steins (2012–2016)

References

External links 
 Official Website

Dutch handball clubs
Sports clubs in Sittard-Geleen